Manoel Viana is a Brazilian municipality in the western part of the state of Rio Grande do Sul.  It has a population of 7,307 (2020). Its elevation is 113 m. It has an area of 1,390.7  square kilometers making it one of the largest municipalities in the state. It is located 590 km west of the state capital of Porto Alegre and east of Alegrete. It is the only municipality that is by the Ibicuí River.

References

External links

http://www.citybrazil.com.br/rs/manoelviana/ 

Municipalities in Rio Grande do Sul